The Son is a play by Florian Zeller. It premiered in February 2018 at the Comédie des Champs-Élysées, Paris, with Yvan Attal (Pierre), Anne Consigny (Anne), Élodie Navarre (Sofia) and Rod Paradot (Nicolas). The play was produced again in September 2018, with Stéphane Freiss replacing Attal and Florence Darel replacing Consigny. The play was translated into English by Christopher Hampton and premiered in London in February 2019.

Background
The Son is the final play in a trilogy which also includes The Mother and The Father. The Mother premiered in 2010 at the Théâtre de Paris starring Catherine Hiegel and was produced again in 2014 at Théâtre Hébertot. The Father premiered in 2012 starring Robert Hirsch and was produced again in 2015 at the Comédie des Champs-Élysées. The Father has since been performed in over 45 countries.

Summary
Nicolas is 17 years old and lives with his mother, Anne. His father, Pierre, has just had a child with his new girlfriend, Sofia. Anne informs Pierre that their son, a depressed teenager, has not been to school for three months. Pierre then talks with Nicolas, who asks to come and live with him and Sofia. Pierre accepts, changes his high school and will do everything possible to restore his son's appetite for life.

Cast
 Pierre – Yvan Attal, followed by Stéphane Freiss
 Anne – Anne Consigny, followed by Florence Darel
 Sofia – Elodie Navarre
 Nicolas – Rod Paradot
 The doctor – Jean-Philippe Puymartin, followed by Daniel San Pedro
 The nurse – Raphaël Magnabosco

Productions
The play premiered in February 2018 at the Comédie des Champs-Élysées, Paris, with Yvan Attal (Pierre), Anne Consigny (Anne), Élodie Navarre (Sofia) and Rod Paradot (Nicolas). The play was produced again in September 2018, with Stéphane Freiss replacing Attal and Florence Darel replacing Consigny.

The play was translated into English by Christopher Hampton. It premiered in February 2019 under the direction of Michael Longhurst at the Kiln Theatre with actors John Light, Laurie Kynaston and Amanda Abbington. The play was then transferred to the West End to the Duke of York's Theatre. It has since been produced in many countries.

Reception
Jérôme Béglé of Le Point deemed Le Fils a masterpiece. L'Express critic Christophe Barbier praised its emotional power, writing, "To all the fathers of a son over fifteen, Florian Zeller plants a mirror in the heart."

Awards and nominations

Film adaptation

Florian Zeller directed a film adaptation of the play, The Son. The film had its world premiere at the 79th Venice International Film Festival on 7 September 2022.

References

2018 plays
Plays by Florian Zeller
French plays adapted into films
West End plays
Fiction about fatherhood